Paper Bag Records is a Canadian independent record label, artist-management company, and music publisher founded in 2002 and based in Toronto.

History
The label was created to focus on the Toronto-area indie rock music scene. Initial signings were Broken Social Scene and Stars with their breakthrough albums. You Forgot It in People and Heart, respectively. The label helped launch the careers of controller. controller, Tokyo Police Club, and Austra, amongst many others.

For two years in a row, Paper Bag Records had been given the title of 'Best Label' from Toronto's Now Magazine in each of NOW's 2008 and 2009 issues. Another highlight, in the August 2007 issue of US publication XLR8R, Paper Bag Records was voted #14 "Best Indie Label".

In 2011, four releases were long-listed for the Polaris Music Prize; Austra's Feel It Break, PS I Love You's Meet Me at the Muster Station, The Rural Alberta Advantage's Departing and Young Galaxy's Shapeshifting, with Feel It Break grabbing a nomination for the shortlist.

Paper Bag Records launched their "Paper Bag Digital" online store in June 2008, which features their entire catalog for purchase and download in mp3 and FLAC formats.

The Paper Bag Records series of vinyl releases were produced in very limited quantities, with each run between 300-500 copies. To make the vinyl even more of a collector's item, they are released on coloured 180-gram vinyl with silk-screened artwork.

Since the switch in management in 2009, Trevor Larocque, the only original founder still part of the company, made significant changes to the label's identity and improved its image. The Toronto Star in 2011 is quoted with a mention that the label is "having one of the best years of its existence" and in early 2012, Toronto's weekly paper The Grid recognized the label as a "cornerstone of Canadian music" and in September 2012, CBC Radio said the Paper Bag Records "could be the most influential label in Canada". Under this management, new bands joined the label; Elliott BROOD, The Rural Alberta Advantage, Born Ruffians, Young Galaxy, Cuff the Duke, PS I Love You, and are all enjoying success on an international level. In the summer of 2012, the label announced the addition of Montreal artists Tim Hecker, Moonface (Spencer Krug), Yamantaka // Sonic Titan and The Luyas to its roster.

In an effort to have the independent labels of Toronto come together on a project, Paper Bag Records played host to the first Independent Label Market event in Canada, during the NXNE 2013.

Awards and nominationsJuno Award|-
|  || Broken Social Scene You Forgot It in People || Alternative Album of the Year || 
|-
|  || Stars Heart || Alternative Album of the Year || 
|-
|  || Tokyo Police Club Cheer It On || Video of the Year || 
|-
|  || Austra Feel It Break || Electronic Album of the Year || 
|-
|  || Cuff The Duke Morning Comes || Adult Alternative Album of the Year || 
|-
|  || The Rural Alberta Advantage Stamp || Video of the Year || 
|-
|  || The Rural Alberta Advantage || New Group of the Year || 
|-
|  || Elliott BROOD Days Into Years || Roots & Traditional Album of the Year || 
|-
|  || Born Ruffians || Breakthrough Group of the Year || 
|-
|  || Yamantaka//Sonic Titan UZU || Alternative Album of the Year || 
|-
|  || Elliott BROOD Work And Love || Roots & Traditional Album of the Year || 
|-
|  || Sarah Neufeld The Ridge || Instrumental Album of the Year || 
|-Polaris Music Prize|-
|  || The Deadly Snakes Porcella || Polaris Music Prize || 
|-
|  || Austra Feel It Break || Polaris Music Prize || 
|-
|  || Yamantaka // Sonic Titan Yamantaka // Sonic Titan || Polaris Music Prize || 
|-
|  || Young Galaxy Ultramarine || Polaris Music Prize || 
|-
|  || Yamantaka // Sonic Titan UZU || Polaris Music Prize || 
|-MuchMusic Video Award|-
| 2007 || Tokyo Police Club Cheer It On || Best Independent Video  || 
|-
|-
| 2011 || You Say Party Lonely's Lunch || Best Independent Video  || 
|-
|-
| 2011 || You Say Party Lonely's Lunch || Director of the Year - Sean Wainsteim  || 
|-Plug Awards|-
|rowspan="2"| 2007 || Tokyo Police Club Nature of the Experiment || Song of the Year || 
|-
|| Tokyo Police Club || New Artist of the Year || 
|-
|rowspan="2"| 2008 || Sally Shapiro Disco Romance || Dance/Electronic Album of the Year || 
|-
|| Sally Shapiro || Female Artist of the Year || Western Canadian Music Awards'''

|-
| 2010 || You Say Party XXXX'' || Rock Recording Of The Year  || 
|-

Discography

See also
 List of record labels

References

External links
 Official site
 Paper Bag Digital (online store)
 Interview with founder Trevor Larocque (via Talk Rock To Me) August 10, 2012

 
Canadian independent record labels
Record labels established in 2002
Alternative rock record labels
Indie rock record labels
Companies based in Toronto
2002 establishments in Ontario